is a Japanese anime television series created by Nippon Animation. The show originally aired from 1983 to 1985 and was primarily educational. Episodes usually dealt with scientific discoveries and inventions, though there were also a few futuristic and science fiction stories and situations.

The series has been translated into many languages, including Spanish (as Los mil viajes en los sueños de Mimi), French (as Ordy ou les Grandes Découvertes), Portuguese (as Descobertas sem limite), Hebrew (as דימי בעקבות התגליות הגדולות, Dimi Following the great discoveries, Dimi Be'Iqvot HaTagliot HaGdolot), Arabic (as اسألوا لبيبة ; Ask Labeebah; "Is'aloo Labeebah"), Serbo-Croatian (as Otkrića bez granica), Macedonian (as Откритија без граници), Persian (as "ماجراهای دانی‌"; Adventure of Dani ), Dutch (as Eindeloze Ontdekkingen) and Cantonese (as 小豆丁).

Notable persons presented in the show 

 Albert Einstein
 Alexander Fleming
 Alexander Graham Bell
 Alfred Wegener
 Charles Darwin
 Galileo Galilei
 George Stephenson
 Isaac Newton
 James Watt
 Jean-Henri Fabre
 Jean-François Champollion
 Johannes Kepler
 Louis Pasteur
 Nicéphore Niépce
 Thomas Edison
 Wright brothers

References

External links 
  

1983 anime television series debuts
Adventure anime and manga
Drama anime and manga
Nippon Animation
Science fiction anime and manga